Henry E. Lackey High School is a high school in Charles County, Maryland, United States.  It is run by Charles County Public Schools.

History
The current building was completed in 1969, replacing a previous building built in 1953 which was rededicated as General Smallwood Middle School.  At the same time, it was combined with the former Pomonkey High School built in 1957,
A webpage of the College of Southern Maryland may refer to an earlier Pomonkey High School building than the one mentioned in the Banneker School's webpage., Until 1965 this was a segregated (African-American) school. which was rededicated as Matthew Henson Middle School.

The high school is named for Rear Admiral Henry E. Lackey of the local Naval facility, who was credited with helping to start the school at Indian Head, Maryland, in 1920, one of the first high schools in the county.  The school originally bore only his last name, initially the Lackey School, then Lackey High School, but was renamed to his full name in 2001 to make it clearer.

Although the mailing address says Indian Head, only the original Lackey School was located within Indian Head, Maryland. The General Smallwood Middle School is located in Potomac Heights, Maryland, while the current building is closest to the village of Marbury, Maryland.

Education

Advanced Placement courses
Currently, Lackey offers the following AP Courses:
 English Language and Composition
 English Literature and Composition
 European History
 Human Geography
 Psychology
 United States History
 World History
 Calculus AB
 Statistics
 Biology
 Chemistry
 Environmental Science
 Physics 1
 Spanish Language
 Art History
 Computer Science Principles 
 Programming

Sports
Currently, the Lackey Chargers compete in the SMAC (Southern Maryland Athletic Conference) along with the other public schools in Charles, Calvert, and St. Mary's Counties.

Below is a list of varsity athletics offered at Lackey.
Boys' & Girls' Soccer
Golf
Volleyball
Field Hockey
Cross Country
Football
Cheerleading
Swimming
Wrestling
Indoor Track
Boys' & Girls' Basketball
Tennis
Outdoor Track
Baseball
Softball
Boys' & Girls' Lacrosse

Football
The Chargers have won 3 regional titles and 2 conference titles over the past 5 years.

Basketball
Lackey's Men's and Women's Basketball programs won 3 conference championships, 1 regional championship, and had 3 appearances in the regional championship game in 4 years.

Wrestling
The Wrestling program has also had a storied history, especially during the 20 years under Glenn Jones (who was inducted into the National Wrestling Hall of Fame in November 2007)

Swimming
Lackey is also one of only three schools in the county to have an indoor pool.

Track and Field
For the past 4 years Lackey has won 1st place for SMAC (southern Maryland athletic conference), Regionals, and States. They are 4 year champs for each of these.

References

External links

Public high schools in Maryland
Schools in Charles County, Maryland
Educational institutions established in 1969
1969 establishments in Maryland